Pinky may refer to:

 Pinky finger, the smallest finger on the human hand

People
 Pinky Maidasani, first female folk rapper and Indian playback singer
 Pinky Rajput (born 1969), Indian voice artist
 Pinky (nickname), a list
 Pinky Lee (1907–1993), television personality born Pincus Leff, host of The Pinky Lee Show
 Stage name of Zhou Jieqiong, Chinese K-pop singer
 "La Pinky", stage name of Dominican Republic children's entertainer Nuryn Sanlley

Arts and entertainment

Fictional characters
 Pinky, played by Harpo Marx in the movies Horse Feathers and Duck Soup
 Pinky, a pig in the 1950s British TV program Pinky and Perky
 Pinky Tuscadero, a recurring character in the 1974-1984 TV series Happy Days
 Pinky, a pink koala in the 1984 Japanese cartoon Noozles, aka Fushigi na Koala Blinky
 Pinky, a panther in the 1980s TV cartoon Pink Panther and Sons
 Pinky, a lab mouse in the 1990s  TV cartoon Pinky and the Brain and Animaniacs
 Pinky, a cat in the online animated TV series The Pinky Show
 Pinky, the main character in the 2000s American TV cartoon Pinky Dinky Doo and mixed up Mary
 Pinky, a title character and female kung fu hero in the 2000s international TV series Kung Faux
 Lady Pinky, an alien from The Brave Fighter of Legend Da-Garn
 Pinky, a chihuahua secret agent in 2000s TV cartoon Phineas and Ferb; see List of characters in Phineas and Ferb
 Pinky, a character in the TV series Outsourced
 Pinky the Whiz Kid, a comic book character
 Pinky, the pink ghost in the video game series Pac-Man and Ms. Pac-Man
 Pinky Demon, a monster antagonist in the Doom (video game) series
 Pinky, a flying pig from Magic Adventures of Mumfie.

Film and television
 Pinky (film), a 1949 American film directed by Elia Kazan
 "Pinky", an episode of My Name Is Earl the title character of Pinky the Cat, an early 1990s video
 Pinky Rose, Sissy Spacek's character in the 1977 film 3 Women''

Other arts and entertainment
 Pinky (comics), an Italian comic series

Other uses
 Pinky (magazine), a Japanese fashion magazine
 Pinky (candy), a confection marketed by Japanese company Frente
 Pinky (dolphin), an albino dolphin spotted in Calcasieu Lake, Louisiana
 pinky, a lightweight version of the UNIX finger protocol
 Pinky, a street name of the synthetic opioid U-47700

See also
 Pinky toe, a colloquial term for the outermost human toe
 Pinky:St, or Pinky Street, collectible figures made by Japanese company Vance
 Pink (disambiguation)
 Pinkie (disambiguation)